Trollkontroll is a TV series directed by Anders Jacobsson and Sören Olsson. It has eight episodes, and originally aired over TV2 between 8 January-26 February 1990.

Plot
The main characters are three guardian angels and the three persons they are guardians for.

References

1990 Swedish television series debuts
1990 Swedish television series endings
Angels in television
Sveriges Television original programming